Heywoods Beach is a beach in Barbados.

Beaches of Barbados